The Haddington Range is a mountain range on northeastern Devon Island, Nunavut, Canada. It is one of the northernmost mountain ranges in the world forming part of the Arctic Cordillera mountain system.

See also
List of mountain ranges

References

Arctic Cordillera
Mountain ranges of Qikiqtaaluk Region
Devon Island